Loricariichthys ucayalensis is a species of catfish in the family Loricariidae. It is native to South America, where it occurs in the Ucayali River basin, for which it is named, in the upper Amazon River drainage in Peru. The species reaches  in total length and is believed to be a facultative air-breather.

References 

Loricariini
Endemic fauna of Peru
Taxa named by Charles Tate Regan
Catfish of South America